KKCM (92.1 FM) is an American radio station licensed to serve the community of Thermal, California. The station airs a country music format and is currently owned by Copper Mountain Broadcasting Company. Simulcast on 96.3 for the Morongo Basin since 92.1 there is simulcast of KHCS.

References

External links
 
 

KCM
Country radio stations in the United States